Martín Fernández Benítez (born 23 June 2003) is a Uruguayan professional footballer who plays as a midfielder for Boston River.

Club career
Fernández is a youth academy graduate of Cerro. He made his professional debut for the club on 7 October 2020 in a 2–1 league defeat against Cerro Largo.

International career
Fernández is a current Uruguayan youth international. On 23 October 2021, he was named in Uruguay under-20 squad for friendlies against Costa Rica and Honduras.

Career statistics

References

External links
 

Living people
2003 births
Footballers from Montevideo
Association football midfielders
Uruguayan footballers
Uruguayan Primera División players
C.A. Cerro players
Boston River players